The André Mignot Hospital is a celebrated teaching hospital in Le Chesnay. Part of the Centre Hospitalier de Versailles and a teaching hospital of Versailles Saint-Quentin-en-Yvelines University.

It has been created in 1981. It was named in honour of André Mignot, French Politician and Lawyer.

Notable people associated with the Hospital

 Nicolas Anelka, French football manager and former player, is born in the hospital 
 Pierre-Joseph Desault, French anatomist and surgeon

References

External links
André Mignot Hospital

Hospitals in Île-de-France
Hospital buildings completed in 1981
Teaching hospitals in France
Buildings and structures in Île-de-France
Hospitals established in 1981
1981 establishments in France
20th-century architecture in France